"Me Myself and I" is a song by American hip hop trio De La Soul, released in April 1989 as a single from their debut studio album, 3 Feet High and Rising (1989). It was the group's only number one on the US Billboard R&B chart. The song also topped the Billboard Hot Dance Club Play chart. 

The song's number one position in The Netherlands was spurred by the VPRO television station, who made a documentary about De La Soul after meeting them when they were still unknown. The record label Indisc acquired the local rights from Tommy Boy Records, and immediately seized the opportunity to release the song as a single. It ranked number 46 on VH1's 100 Greatest Songs of Hip Hop.

Critical reception
Jerry Smith from Music Week wrote, "Hot dance band of the moment, De La Soul issue this engagingly loping track from their much acclaimed album, 3 Feet High and Rising. And its strong beat and rhythmic rap is sure to take it high chartwards."

Track listing

List of samples
"Me Myself and I"
 "(Not Just) Knee Deep" by Funkadelic (1979)
 "Rapper Dapper Snapper" by Edwin Birdsong (1980)
 "Funky Worm" by the Ohio Players (1973)
 "The Original Human Beatbox" by Doug E. Fresh (1985)
 "Gonna Make You Mine" by Loose Ends (1986)

"Ain't Hip to Be Labeled a Hippie"
 "Hard Times" by Dr. Buzzard's Original Savannah Band (1976)

"What's More"
 "You Baby" by The Turtles (1966)

"Brain-Washed Follower"
 "Funky President" by James Brown (1974)
 "You Made A Believer (Out of Me)" by Ruby Andrews (1971)
 "Booty Butt" by Ray Charles (1971)
 "So This Is Our Goodbye" by The Moments (1972)

Charts

Weekly charts

Year-end charts

Certifications

Compilation appearances
All That "Hip Hop" (2005)

References

1989 singles
Songs written by Vincent Mason
Songs written by Kelvin Mercer
Songs written by David Jude Jolicoeur
Songs written by Prince Paul (producer)
De La Soul songs
Dutch Top 40 number-one singles
Song recordings produced by Prince Paul (producer)
1989 songs
Tommy Boy Records singles
Songs written by George Clinton (funk musician)
Jazz rap songs